Before Me may refer to:

Before Me, album by Gladys Knight 2006 
"Before Me", song by Arcane Roots from Melancholia Hymns